The 2022 Serena Wines 1881 Tennis Cup Internazionali di Tennis del Friuli Venezia Giulia was a professional tennis tournament played on outdoor clay courts. It was the nineteenth edition of the tournament which was part of the 2022 ATP Challenger Tour, and the seventh edition of the tournament which was part of the 2022 ITF Women's World Tennis Tour. It took place in Cordenons, Italy between 25 July and 7 August 2022.

Champions

Men's singles

  Zhang Zhizhen def.  Andrea Vavassori 2–6, 7–6(7–5), 6–3.

Men's doubles

  Dustin Brown /  Andrea Vavassori def.  Ivan Sabanov /  Matej Sabanov 6–4, 7–5.

Women's singles

  Panna Udvardy def.  Elina Avanesyan, 6–2, 6–0

Women's doubles

  Angelica Moratelli /  Eva Vedder def.  Yuliana Lizarazo /  Aurora Zantedeschi, 6–3, 6–2.

Men's singles main-draw entrants

Seeds

 1 Rankings are as of 25 July 2022.

Other entrants
The following players received wildcards into the singles main draw:
  Marco Cecchinato
  Laslo Đere
  Gianmarco Ferrari

The following players received entry into the singles main draw as special exempts:
  Raúl Brancaccio
  Ernests Gulbis

The following players received entry into the singles main draw as alternates:
  Nikolás Sánchez Izquierdo
  Andrea Vavassori

The following players received entry from the qualifying draw:
  Mattia Bellucci
  Kimmer Coppejans
  Giacomo Dambrosi
  João Domingues
  Viktor Durasovic
  Nicolas Moreno de Alboran

The following player received entry as a lucky loser:
  Andrey Chepelev

Women's singles main draw entrants

Seeds

 1 Rankings are as of 18 July 2022.

Other entrants
The following players received wildcards into the singles main draw:
  Matilde Paoletti
  Jessica Pieri
  Federica Urgesi
  Aurora Zantedeschi

The following player received entry into the singles main draw as a special exempt:
  Anna Turati

The following players received entry from the qualifying draw:
  Federica Arcidiacono
  Bianca Behúlová
  Nuria Brancaccio
  Veronika Erjavec
  Angelica Moratelli
  Tayisiya Morderger
  Julia Riera
  Bianca Turati

The following players received as lucky losers:
  Timea Jarušková
  Arianna Zucchini

References

External links
 2022 Internazionali di Tennis del Friuli Venezia Giulia at ITFtennis.com
 2022 Internazionali di Tennis del Friuli Venezia Giulia at ATPtour.com
 Official website

2022
2022 ATP Challenger Tour
2022 ITF Women's World Tennis Tour
2022 in Italian tennis
July 2022 sports events in Italy
August 2022 sports events in Italy